The BUT 9612T was a two-axle double deck trolleybus chassis manufactured by British United Traction in 1955/56. A total of 70 were manufactured by Crossley Motors' Stockport factory; 62 for Manchester and eight for Ashton.

References

British United Traction
Trolleybuses
Vehicles introduced in 1955